Mary Antoinette Rivero (born February 26, 1988), also known as Toni Rivero, is a taekwondo practitioner from the Philippines. She represented the country in the 2004 and 2008 Summer Olympics. Rivero was born in Makati.

See also
 Philippines at the 2008 Summer Olympics

References

1988 births
Filipino female taekwondo practitioners
Olympic taekwondo practitioners of the Philippines
Taekwondo practitioners at the 2004 Summer Olympics
Taekwondo practitioners at the 2008 Summer Olympics
Ateneo de Manila University alumni
Living people
Asian Games medalists in taekwondo
Taekwondo practitioners at the 2006 Asian Games
Asian Games silver medalists for the Philippines
Medalists at the 2006 Asian Games
Southeast Asian Games gold medalists for the Philippines
Southeast Asian Games silver medalists for the Philippines
Southeast Asian Games medalists in taekwondo
Competitors at the 2003 Southeast Asian Games
Competitors at the 2005 Southeast Asian Games
Competitors at the 2007 Southeast Asian Games
Competitors at the 2009 Southeast Asian Games
Asian Taekwondo Championships medalists
21st-century Filipino women